Prentiss is an unincorporated community and coal town located in Ohio County, Kentucky, United States. It was also known as Gasburg.

References

Unincorporated communities in Ohio County, Kentucky
Unincorporated communities in Kentucky
Coal towns in Kentucky